Marcos Acosta (born 7 December 1991), is a Paraguayan professional footballer who plays as a midfielder for Orense.

Career

Cerro Porteño
After being loaned out to Cerro Porteño for the 2018 season, the club signed him permanently on a contract until 2021.

References

External links
 it.uefa.com
 

1991 births
Living people
Paraguayan footballers
Paraguayan Primera División players
Primeira Liga players
Categoría Primera A players
Ecuadorian Serie A players
Club Tacuary footballers
Vitória F.C. players
Club Nacional footballers
Club Rubio Ñu footballers
Once Caldas footballers
Cerro Porteño players
River Plate (Asunción) footballers
Orense S.C. players
Paraguayan expatriate footballers
Expatriate footballers in Portugal
Expatriate footballers in Colombia
Expatriate footballers in Ecuador
Paraguayan expatriate sportspeople in Portugal
Paraguayan expatriate sportspeople in Colombia
Paraguayan expatriate sportspeople in Ecuador
Association football midfielders
20th-century Paraguayan people
21st-century Paraguayan people